The Guardian Angel (French: L'ange gardien) is a 1942 French comedy film directed by Jacques de Casembroot and starring Lucien Baroux, Roger Duchesne and Jacques Varennes.

It was shot at the Saint-Laurent-du-Var Studios in Nice. The film's sets were designed by the art director Roger Briaucourt. It was produced by the French branch of Minerva Film.

Synopsis
A retired colonial official lives a quiet life but things are dramatically changed when he has to look after his granddaughter for a while.

Cast
 Lucien Baroux as 	Duboin
 Carlettina as Colette
 Roger Duchesne as Henri Duboin
 Jacques Varennes as Tirandier
 Catherine Fonteney as La cousine Noémie
 Ellen Dosia as Jane Duboin-Fontange
 Irène Corday as Marie
 Alfred Baillou as Un invité
 Paul Demange as Le notaire
 Maxime Fabert as Le jardinier
 Jean Fay as L'impresario
 Jeanne Fusier-Gir as Mademoiselle Boulommier
 Pierre Labry as Jaminet
 Georges Sellier as Carpent
 Léon Walther as Molignon
 Jean Morel	
 Vicky Verley	
 Max David 
 Eugène Yvernès

References

Bibliography 
 Rège, Philippe . Encyclopedia of French Film Directors, Volume 1. Scarecrow Press, 2009.

External links 
 

1942 films
1942 comedy films
French comedy  films
1940s French-language films
Films directed by Jacques de Casembroot
1940s French films